The Mohammed V Mosque is a large mosque in Tangier, Morocco, completed in 1983.

It was erected on the initiative of then Crown Prince Mohammed of Morocco, now King Mohammed VI, and named after his grandfather Mohammed V who had given a historic address in Tangier in 1947. 

According to local lore, a visiting Kuwaiti sheikh had been displeased by the fact that the bell tower of the nearby Catholic Cathedral dominated the skyline of that part of Tangier, and offered financing so that a Muslim tower would surpass it. Be that as it may, the Mohammed V Mosque's minaret is the tallest in Tangier. 

The mosque complex also includes the seat of the regional Ulama council, a theological institute and boarding school named after , the local delegation of the Moroccan Ministry of Habous & Islamic Affairs, and a library.

See also
 Lalla Abla Mosque
 Mausoleum of Mohammed V
 List of mosques in Morocco

Notes

Mosques in Tangier
Tourist attractions in Tangier